Black Butte is a mountain butte located in the Northern Coast Ranges of California south of Mendocino Pass.

The mountain on the Mendocino National Forest is the highest point in county of Glenn County. The high elevation of the mountain and plateau bring heavy winter snowfall and a low average annual temperature.
US Forest Highway 7, a dirt road connection between the eastern and western segments of State Route 162 passes to the north of Black Butte. However, this route is closed in winter due to heavy snowfall.

See also 
 List of highest points in California by county

References

External links
 

Mountains of Glenn County, California
Buttes of California
Mountains of Northern California